Runaljod – Ragnarok is the third album by the Norwegian Nordic folk band Wardruna, released on 21 October 2016 by Indie Recordings/By Norse Music. It is the final chapter of the trilogy Runaljod, inspired by the 24 ancient runes of the Elder Futhark.

The album was preceded by the release of the first single, "Odal", on 21 August.

On 6 October, Wardruna released a music video and single for the song "Raido". The video was filmed, directed and produced by Finnish photographer Tuukka Koski.

Track listing
Adapted from AllMusic.

Personnel
 Kvitrafn – vocals, drums, percussion, electronics, instruments
 Lindy Fay Hella – vocals
 Eilif Gundersen – bronze lure, birchbark lure, goat horn, willow flute, ice percussion
 Skarvebarna Children's Choir – choir
 Arne Sandvoll – vocals
 HC Daalgard – vocals
 Kjell Braaten – vocals

Charts

References

External links
Metallum Archives
Discogs.com

2016 albums
Wardruna albums